Guitrancourt is a commune in the Yvelines department in the Île-de-France region in north-central France.

Philosopher Jacques Lacan owned a local mansion called Prévôté. He lived there from 1955 until his death in 1981 and was buried at the municipal cemetery.

See also
Communes of the Yvelines department

References

Communes of Yvelines